Clive Stuart McFadzean (born 11 March 1958) is a Scottish former professional footballer who played as a forward.

Career
Born in Kilmarnock, McFadzean joined Bradford City from Farsley Celtic in November 1974. He joined the first-team in March 1976, making four league appearances for the club, scoring two goals. He was released by the club in 1977, later playing for Ossett.

Sources

References

1958 births
Living people
Scottish footballers
Farsley Celtic F.C. players
Bradford City A.F.C. players
English Football League players
Association football forwards